Keep It Hood is an extended play by American rapper MC Eiht of Compton's Most Wanted. It was released on January 4, 2013 via Blue Stamp Music Group, and served as prelude to Which Way Iz West. The production of the entire EP was handled by Austrian record producer Brenk Sinatra with executive producer 808. It features scratches from DJ Premier, who mixed and mastered the album.

A sequel to the album titled Keep It Hood Part 2 was supposed to be released in 2018.

Track listing

References

External links

Keep It Hood by MC Eiht on iTunes

2013 EPs
MC Eiht albums
Gangsta rap EPs